The state border–Čakovec–Kotoriba–state border railway, officially designated as the M501 railway, is a  railway line in Croatia that connects the towns of Čakovec and Kotoriba to Slovene railway network via Pragersko and the Hungarian capital city Budapest via Murakeresztúr. The line is single-tracked and non-electrified.

The M501 railway connects to the rest of the Croatian railway network in Čakovec, where the R201 line extending south to Varaždin forms a junction with the M501. The M501 also connects to the L101 in Čakovec. The L101 serves Mursko Središće to the north of the M501 and also the town of Lendava in Slovenia.

History
The Čakovec–Kotoriba railway was opened on 24 April 1860 as part of a railway line from Nagykanizsa to Pragersko, the purpose was to connect Budapest to the existing Vienna–Trieste railway at the Pragersko. This was the first railroad built in present-day Croatia.  The route had three railway stations in Kotoriba, Donji Kraljevec, and Čakovec.

In 1863 were built new railway stations in Mala Subotica and Donji Mihaljevec, in 1920 was opened railway stop Čakovec-Buzovec, and in 1940s were opened railway stops in Čehovec, Macinec, and Dunjkovec.

During the World War II in 1941 the bridge over river Mura was blown up, but the second one was already built before end of the war.

Gallery

See also
List of railways in Croatia

Maps

References

External links

Railway lines in Croatia
Buildings and structures in Čakovec
Establishments in the Kingdom of Croatia (Habsburg)
Railway line